The 2003 Women's Six Nations Championship was the second series of the rugby union Women's Six Nations Championship and was won by , who achieved the Grand Slam.

Table

Results

See also
Women's Six Nations Championship
Women's international rugby union

References

External links
The official RBS Six Nations Site

2003
2002–03 in English rugby union
2002–03 in French rugby union
2002–03 in Irish rugby union
2002–03 in Welsh rugby union
2002–03 in Scottish rugby union
2002–03 in Spanish rugby union
2002–03 in European women's rugby union
rugby union
rugby union
rugby union
rugby union
International women's rugby union competitions hosted by Spain
Women
rugby union
rugby union
Women's Six Nations
Women's Six Nations